Mitchell Amundsen (born May 31, 1958) is an American cinematographer.

Filmography

References

External links

Variety - Mitch Amundsen

1958 births
Living people
American cinematographers
American film directors